KSSU (91.9 FM) is a radio station broadcasting a contemporary hit radio format. Licensed to Durant, Oklahoma, United States, the station serves Southeastern Oklahoma State University. The station is currently owned by Southeastern Oklahoma State University.

References

External links
 Official Website
 

SSU
Contemporary hit radio stations in the United States